William Stephen Belichick (born April 16, 1952) is an American professional football coach who is the head coach and general manager of the New England Patriots of the National Football League (NFL). Widely regarded as one of the greatest coaches of all time, he holds numerous coaching records, including the record of most Super Bowl wins (six) as a head coach, all with the Patriots, along with two more during his time as the defensive coordinator of the New York Giants,  for the record of eight combined total Super Bowl victories as coach and coordinator. Belichick is often referred to as a "student of the game", with a deep knowledge of the intricacies of each player position, and is known as a renowned American football historian. Under his tenure with the Patriots, he was a central figure as the head coach as well as the chief executive during the franchise's dynasty from 2001 to 2019.

Belichick began his coaching career in 1975 and became the defensive coordinator for New York Giants head coach Bill Parcells by 1985. Parcells and Belichick won two Super Bowls together before Belichick left to become the head coach of the Cleveland Browns in 1991. He remained in Cleveland for five seasons but was fired following the team's 1995 season. He rejoined Parcells, first in New England where the team lost Super Bowl XXXI, and later with the New York Jets.

After being named head coach of the Jets, Belichick resigned after only one day on the job to accept the head coaching job for the New England Patriots on January 27, 2000. Since then, he has led the Patriots to 17 AFC East division titles, 13 appearances in the AFC Championship Game, and nine Super Bowl appearances, with a record six wins. Overall, Belichick has won eight Super Bowl titles (the most of any individual in NFL history) and finished as runner-up four times from his combined time as an assistant and head coach.

Belichick is the NFL's longest-tenured active head coach, as well as the first all-time in playoff coaching wins with 31 and third in regular season coaching wins in the NFL with 294. In addition, Belichick is second place for combined regular season and postseason wins, and also second place for most regular season coaching wins with one franchise.   He is one of only three head coaches who have won six NFL titles. He was named the AP NFL Coach of the Year for the 2003, 2007, and 2010 seasons. Belichick has also been selected to the NFL 2000s All-Decade Team, NFL 2010s All-Decade Team, as well as the NFL 100th Anniversary All-Time Team, and is the only active head coach on the latter team.

Early life
Belichick was born on April 16, 1952, in Nashville the son of Jeannette (Munn) and Steve Belichick (born Stephen Biličić). Bill was named after College Football Hall of Fame coach Bill Edwards, who was his godfather. Belichick is of Croatian ancestry and his paternal grandparents, Ivan Biličić and Marija (Mary) Barković, emigrated from the Croatian village of Draganić, Karlovac, in 1897, settling in Monessen, Pennsylvania.

He was raised in Annapolis, Maryland where his father was an assistant football coach at the United States Naval Academy. Belichick has said his father is one of his most important football mentors, and Belichick often studied football with him. Bill reportedly learned to break down game films at a young age by watching his father and the Navy staff do their jobs. He graduated from Annapolis High School in 1970 with classmate Sally Brice-O'Hara. While there he played football and lacrosse, with the latter being his favorite sport. He enrolled at Phillips Academy in Andover, Massachusetts, for a postgraduate year, with the intention of improving his grades and test scores to be admitted into a quality college. The school honored him 40 years later by inducting him into its Athletics Hall of Honor in 2011.

Belichick attended Wesleyan University in Middletown, Connecticut where he played center and tight end. In addition to being a member of the football team, he played lacrosse and squash, serving as the captain of the lacrosse team during his senior season. A member of Chi Psi fraternity, he earned a bachelor's degree in economics in 1975. Eventually he was part of the inaugural induction class into the university's Athletics Hall of Fame in spring 2008.

Coaching career

Early coaching positions
After graduating, Belichick took a $25-per-week job as an assistant to Baltimore Colts head coach Ted Marchibroda in 1975. In 1976, he joined the Detroit Lions as their assistant special teams coach before adding tight ends and wide receivers to his coaching duties in 1977. He was dismissed along with head coach Tommy Hudspeth and the rest of the coaching staff on January 9, 1978. He spent the 1978 season with the Denver Broncos as their assistant special teams coach and defensive assistant.

New York Giants (1979–1990)
In 1979, Belichick began a 12-year stint with the New York Giants alongside head coach Ray Perkins as a defensive assistant and special teams coach. He added linebackers coaching to his duties in 1980 and was named defensive coordinator in 1985 under head coach Bill Parcells, who had replaced Perkins in 1983. The Giants won Super Bowl XXI and Super Bowl XXV following the 1986 and 1990 seasons. His defensive game plan from the New York Giants' 20–19 upset of the Buffalo Bills in Super Bowl XXV has been placed in the Pro Football Hall of Fame.

Cleveland Browns (1991–1995)
From 1991 until 1995, Belichick was the head coach of the Cleveland Browns. During his tenure in Cleveland, he compiled a 36–44 record, leading the team to the playoffs in 1994, his only winning year with the team. Coincidentally, his one playoff victory during his Browns tenure was achieved against the New England Patriots, who were coached by former Giants head coach Bill Parcells, in the Wild Card Round during that postseason. In Belichick's last season in Cleveland, the Browns finished 5–11, despite starting 3–1. One of his most controversial moves was cutting quarterback Bernie Kosar midway through the 1993 season. Kosar was signed by the Dallas Cowboys two days later and won a Super Bowl with the Cowboys in Super Bowl XXVIII as a backup. In November 1995, in the middle of the ongoing football season, Browns owner Art Modell had announced he would move his franchise to Baltimore after the season. After first being given assurances that he would coach the new team that would later become the Baltimore Ravens, Belichick was instead fired on February 14, 1996, one week after the shift was officially announced.

New England Patriots (1996)
After his dismissal by the Cleveland Browns, Belichick served under Parcells again as assistant head coach and defensive backs coach with the Patriots for the 1996 season. The Patriots finished with an 11–5 record and won the AFC Championship over the Jacksonville Jaguars, but they lost to the Green Bay Packers in Super Bowl XXXI amid rumors of Parcells's impending defection.

New York Jets (1997–1999)
Belichick had two stints as the head coach of the New York Jets without ever coaching a game.

In February 1997, Belichick, who had been an assistant coach under Bill Parcells with the New York Giants and New England Patriots, was named the Jets interim head coach while the Jets and Patriots continued to negotiate compensation to release Parcells from his contract with the Patriots and allow Parcells to coach the Jets. Six days later the Patriots and Jets reached an agreement that allowed Parcells to coach the Jets, and Belichick became the team's assistant head coach and defensive coordinator.

When Parcells stepped down as head coach after the 1999 season, he had already arranged with team management to have Belichick succeed him. However, Belichick was the New York Jets' head coach for only one day. On January 4, 2000, when Belichick was introduced as head coach to the media—the day after his hiring was publicized—he turned it into a surprise resignation announcement. Before taking the podium, he scrawled a resignation note on a napkin that read, in its entirety, "I resign as HC of the NYJ." He then delivered a half-hour speech explaining his resignation to the assembled press corps.

Soon after this bizarre turn of events, he was introduced as the Patriots' 12th full-time head coach, succeeding the recently fired Pete Carroll. The Patriots had inquired to the Jets about permission to interview him for their vacant spot at head coach just prior to Parcells stepping down. Parcells and the Jets claimed that Belichick was still under contract to the Jets, and demanded compensation from the Patriots. NFL Commissioner Paul Tagliabue agreed, and the Patriots gave the Jets a first-round draft pick in 2000 in exchange for the right to hire Belichick.

New England Patriots (2000–present)
Soon after hiring Belichick, owner Robert Kraft gave him near-complete control over the team's football operations, making him the de facto general manager as well. Until 2009, Belichick split many of the duties normally held by a general manager on other clubs with player personnel director Scott Pioli, though Belichick had the final say on football matters. Pioli left for the Kansas City Chiefs after the 2008 season.

The Patriots went 5–11 in the 2000 regular season and missed the playoffs.

First three Super Bowl wins: 2001–2004
In 2001, the Patriots went 11–5 in the regular season, and defeated the Oakland Raiders (in the "Tuck Rule Game") and Pittsburgh Steelers on the way to the Super Bowl. In Super Bowl XXXVI, Belichick's defense held the St. Louis Rams' offense, which had averaged 31 points during the season, to 17 points, and the Patriots won on a last-second field goal by Adam Vinatieri. The win was the first Super Bowl championship in Patriots history.

The following season (2002)—the first in Gillette Stadium—the Patriots went 9–7 and missed the playoffs. New England finished with the same record as the New York Jets and the Miami Dolphins, but the Jets won the AFC East title as a result of the third tiebreaker (record among common opponents).

The Patriots' 2003 season started with a 31–0 loss to the Buffalo Bills in Week 1, a few days after they released team defensive captain Lawyer Milloy. However, they dominated through the remainder of the season to finish 14–2, setting a new franchise record for wins in a season. In the final week of the regular season, the Patriots avenged their loss to the Bills by the same 31–0 score. They defeated the Tennessee Titans in the Divisional Round. Playing against the Indianapolis Colts and Co-MVP Peyton Manning in the AFC Championship (Steve McNair of the Titans was also Co-MVP), the Patriots recorded four interceptions, and advanced to Super Bowl XXXVIII, where they defeated the Carolina Panthers 32–29 on a late Adam Vinatieri field goal. Belichick was awarded the NFL Coach of the Year Award.

In 2004, the Patriots once again finished with a 14–2 record, and they defeated the Indianapolis Colts in the Divisional Round. They opened the season at 6–0, which combined with the 15 straight wins to end the previous season, gave New England 21 consecutive victories to break the record for most wins in a row formerly held by the Miami Dolphins with 18 straight victories in the 1972 and 1973 seasons. They defeated the Pittsburgh Steelers in the AFC Championship. In Super Bowl XXXIX, the Patriots beat the Philadelphia Eagles and became only the second team to win three Super Bowls in four years. Belichick is the only coach to accomplish the feat as the Dallas Cowboys had two head coaches in the stretch they won three of four from 1992 to 1995.

The perfect season, Randy Moss, the Manning brothers, and Brady's injury: 2005–2009 
With a new defensive coordinator in Eric Mangini and no named offensive coordinator, the Patriots went 10–6 in the 2005 season and defeated the Jacksonville Jaguars in the Wild Card Round before losing to the Denver Broncos in the Divisional Round. Earlier, with a season-opening win over the Oakland Raiders, Belichick notched his 54th win with the Patriots, passing Mike Holovak as the winningest coach in Patriots history.

The Patriots finished with a 12–4 record in the 2006 season and defeated the New York Jets by a score of 37–16 in the Wild Card Round. They then beat the San Diego Chargers the next week in the Divisional Round, before losing to the eventual Super Bowl XLI winner Indianapolis Colts in the AFC Championship by a score of 38–34. The Patriots led 21–3 mid-way during the second quarter, but the Colts mounted one of the great comebacks in playoff history.

In 2007, Belichick led the Patriots to the first perfect regular season since the introduction of the 16-game regular season schedule in 1978, only the fourth team to do so in National Football League history after the 1934 and 1942 Chicago Bears and 1972 Miami Dolphins. In the Divisional Round of the playoffs, they defeated the Jacksonville Jaguars by a score of 31–20. In the AFC Championship, the Patriots defeated the San Diego Chargers by a score of 21–12. The Patriots were upset in Super Bowl XLII by the New York Giants, his former team, due to the defense allowing a famous play to David Tyree near the end of regulation The Patriots' failure to attain a "perfect season" (undefeated and untied, including playoffs) preserved the Miami Dolphins as the sole team to do so, having finished their 1972 regular season at 14–0 and having won three games in the playoffs. Only two other teams in professional football have recorded a perfect season—the 1948 Cleveland Browns (14–0) of the then All-America Football Conference and the 1948 Calgary Stampeders (12–0) of the Canadian Football League. No team in the former American Football League had a perfect season.

In the Patriots' 2008 season-opener against the Kansas City Chiefs, quarterback Tom Brady sustained a season-ending injury in the first quarter. Backup quarterback Matt Cassel was named the starter for the remainder of the season. However, with a win in Week 2, the Patriots broke their own record for regular season wins in a row with 21 (2006–08). After losing over a dozen players to the injured reserve list, including Rodney Harrison, Adalius Thomas, and Laurence Maroney, the Patriots still managed their league-leading eighth consecutive season with a winning record, going 11–5. Nevertheless, the Patriots, who finished second in the AFC East, missed the playoffs for the first time since 2002, losing on tiebreakers to the Miami Dolphins (who won the division on the fourth tiebreaker, better conference record) and the Baltimore Ravens (who beat out the Patriots for the last playoff spot due to a better conference record). The 1985 Denver Broncos are the only other 11-win team to miss the playoffs in a 16-game season.

In 2009, with a fully healthy Tom Brady back as the starting quarterback, Belichick was able to guide the Patriots to yet another AFC East division title with a 10–6 record. However, the Patriots lost to the Baltimore Ravens in the Wild Card Round.

Spygate

In an incident dubbed "Spygate," on September 9, 2007, NFL security caught a Patriots video assistant taping the New York Jets' defensive signals from the sidelines, which is not an approved location. The NFL rules state "No video recording devices of any kind are permitted to be in use in the coaches' booth, on the field, or in the locker room during the game." Jets coach Eric Mangini, a former Patriots assistant, tipped off league officials that the Patriots might have been filming their signals. After the game, the Jets formally complained to the league.

On September 13, the NFL fined Belichick $500,000—the largest fine ever imposed on a coach in the league's 87-year history, and fined the Patriots $250,000. Additionally, the Patriots forfeited their first-round draft pick in the 2008 NFL Draft. NFL Commissioner Roger Goodell, a former employee of the Jets, said that he fined the Patriots as a team because Belichick exercises so much control over the Patriots' on-field operations that "his actions and decisions are properly attributed to the club." Goodell considered suspending Belichick, but decided that taking away draft picks would be more severe in the long run. Gary Myers, New York Daily News columnist, stated Belichick should have been suspended by Goodell for the Patriots' next game against the Jets.

Belichick later issued the following statement:

The sanctions against Belichick were the harshest imposed on a head coach in league history until the New Orleans Saints' Sean Payton was suspended for the entire 2012 season for covering up a scheme in which bounties were paid for deliberately knocking opponents out of games.

Following the incident and its fallout, Belichick led the Patriots to a perfect 16–0 regular season record, and was awarded the 2007 NFL Coach of the Year Award, as voted on by the Associated Press.

Making five Super Bowls and winning three, Gronkowski, and "We're on to Cincinnati": 2010–2019 

In the 2010 season, Belichick and the Patriots finished with a 14–2 record for the top seed in the AFC. However, their postseason ended quickly with a 28–21 loss to the New York Jets in the divisional round.

In the 2011 season, the Patriots topped the AFC with a 13–3 record. Following a victory over the Denver Broncos in the divisional round, the Patriots won the AFC Championship game, beating the Baltimore Ravens 23–20 when the Ravens failed to score a touchdown and Baltimore's kicker, Billy Cundiff, missed a routine 32-yard field goal attempt to tie the game and send it into overtime. This sent New England to their fifth Super Bowl under Belichick. In Super Bowl XLVI, the Patriots lost in the Super Bowl XLII rematch to the New York Giants by a score of 21–17.

On September 26, 2012, following a 31–30 loss to the Baltimore Ravens, Belichick was fined $50,000 for grabbing a replacement official's arm while asking for more specific clarity on a ruling after Baltimore had narrowly converted a last-second field goal attempt to secure the win. The Patriots finished the 2012 regular season with a 12–4 record. In the divisional round of the playoffs, they defeated the Houston Texans by a score of 41–28 and made it to the AFC Championship Game, where they lost to the eventual Super Bowl XLVII champion Baltimore Ravens by a score of 28–13, ending their season.

Belichick's Patriots began the 2013 season with much upheaval on the offensive side of the ball with the injury of Rob Gronkowski, the arrest and subsequent release of Aaron Hernandez, the departures of Wes Welker to the Denver Broncos and Danny Woodhead to the San Diego Chargers in free agency, and the release of Brandon Lloyd. To replace them, the Patriots signed Danny Amendola in free agency, drafted rookies Aaron Dobson and Josh Boyce, and signed undrafted rookie free agent Kenbrell Thompkins. The team ended the season with a 12–4 record, winning the AFC East and securing a playoff berth and a first-round bye, seeding second in the AFC standings. In the divisional round, they defeated the Indianapolis Colts by a score of 43–22. They lost to the Denver Broncos in the AFC Championship Game by a score of 26–16.

In the 2014 season, Belichick's Patriots started 2–2. At a mid-week press conference following a 41–14 loss to the Kansas City Chiefs, Belichick famously uttered "We're on to Cincinnati" (referring to the Patriots' next opponent) several times in response to follow-up questions and criticisms of his team, Brady in particular. Ultimately, they recorded a 12–4 record for the third straight season. In the divisional round, they defeated the Baltimore Ravens by a score of 35–31. In the AFC Championship Game, they defeated the Indianapolis Colts by a score of 45–7. They reached Super Bowl XLIX, where they defeated the Seattle Seahawks by a score of 28–24. With his fourth championship as head coach, Belichick tied Chuck Noll for most Super Bowl wins by a head coach.

In the 2015 season, Belichick's Patriots recorded a 12–4 record for the fourth straight season. They defeated the Kansas City Chiefs in the divisional round. In the AFC Championship Game, they lost to the eventual Super Bowl 50 champion Denver Broncos by a score of 20–18.

In the 2016 season, Belichick's Patriots recorded a 14–2 record, which earned them the #1 seed for the AFC playoffs. In the divisional round, they defeated the Houston Texans. In the AFC Championship Game, they defeated the Pittsburgh Steelers. They reached Super Bowl LI, where they defeated the Atlanta Falcons in a comeback victory by a score of 34–28 in overtime. The Patriots were down 28–3 at one point in the third quarter. With the victory, Belichick won his record fifth Super Bowl title as a head coach.

In the 2017 season, Belichick's Patriots went 13–3, setting an NFL record eighth consecutive 12-or-more-win seasons, capturing their ninth consecutive AFC East title and their 15th of the last 17 seasons. They defeated the Tennessee Titans in the divisional round by a score of 35–14, and the Jacksonville Jaguars in the AFC Championship Game by a score of 24–20, claiming their second consecutive AFC title, while also extending their record of consecutive AFC Championship Game appearances with seven. Super Bowl LII was Belichick's eighth title game as head coach and his eleventh overall in any capacity, which was also the Patriots' tenth appearance, all extending NFL records. The Ringer wrote that Belichick's "team is different from many of New England's famous teams from the previous decade: The first iteration of the Patriots dynasty relied on defense. This year, they are 29th in yards allowed (though fifth in points allowed) and instead have perfected the art of situational football". The latter Patriots teams have been noted for mounting late comebacks in playoff games.

However, the Patriots fell to the Philadelphia Eagles in Super Bowl LII, 41–33, as Eagles quarterback Nick Foles repeated his dominant NFC Championship Game performance and led Philadelphia to victory in a high-scoring game. The Patriots were down early, as they had been in most of their Super Bowl wins. However, they could not make a comeback this time, although they came very close. Eagles defensive end Brandon Graham strip-sacked Tom Brady to get the ball back with about 2 minutes to go in the 4th quarter. The Patriots did get the ball again before the end of the game, but they ran out of time to score.

In the 2018 season, Belichick's Patriots went 11–5, failing to win 12 or more games for the first time since 2009. Despite this, the Patriots still captured their 10th consecutive AFC East title and their 16th of the last 18 years. They defeated the Los Angeles Chargers in the divisional round by a score of 41–28 and the Kansas City Chiefs in the AFC Championship Game 37–31 in a tough overtime game in Kansas City to advance to their third straight Super Bowl. In Super Bowl LIII, the Patriots defeated the Los Angeles Rams 13–3 to give Belichick his sixth Super Bowl championship as a head coach and his eighth overall to have the most Super Bowl rings in NFL history. His six championships matched both George Halas and Curly Lambeau for most championships as a head coach. The Patriots' defense held the high-scoring Rams offense to 260 total yards.

On May 13, 2019, Belichick announced that he would assume another role as the Patriots' defensive coordinator starting the 2019 season. On October 27, 2019, with the Patriots' win over the Cleveland Browns, Belichick obtained his 300th win, regular and postseason combined, as a head coach. The Patriots finished the 2019 regular season with a 12–4 record, winning their 11th consecutive AFC East title. They were defeated in the wild-card round of the playoffs by the Tennessee Titans, led by former Patriots linebacker Mike Vrabel, by the final score of 20–13.

Brady goes to Tampa Bay, Cam Newton, and Mac Jones: 2020–present 
Following the departure of Tom Brady to the Tampa Bay Buccaneers, Belichick and the Patriots were faced with an uncertain quarterback situation for the first time in nearly two decades. During the offseason, the Patriots signed former Carolina Panthers starter Cam Newton for the 2020 NFL season. The off-season routines and schedules, as well as the normal processes of regular season were severely disrupted by the worldwide COVID-19 pandemic. Despite the unanticipated difficulties and challenges of the pandemic, the Patriots were in the hunt for a playoff spot until late in the season, ultimately finishing 7–9. 2020 was Belichick's first losing season since his first year in New England.

In the 2021 NFL Draft, the Patriots selected quarterback Mac Jones with the 15th overall pick. After Jones and Newton competed for the starting job during the preseason, Belichick made the decision to release Newton and name Jones the starter for the upcoming season. In week 4 of that season, Brady's Buccaneers visited the Patriots in his first trip to Gillette Stadium since signing with the Patriots. A missed 56-yard field goal by Patriots kicker Nick Folk allowed Tampa Bay to narrowly escape with a 19–17 victory. Immediately after the game, Brady and Belichick shared a quick embrace on the field before Brady greeted his former teammates and other members of the Patriots organization. Though fans criticized Belichick for his lack of warmth displayed towards his former quarterback, the two privately spoke at length in the Buccaneers locker room following the match. Belichick helped lead the Patriots to a 10–7 record in 2021. The team fell to the Buffalo Bills in the Wild Card Round.

In the 2022 season, despite starting quarterback Mac Jones being injured in Week 3 and subsequently missing three more weeks, the Patriots remained in the hunt for a playoff spot until the last week, finishing with a record of 8-9.

Overall record in New England
Under Belichick, the Patriots have a regular-season record of 262–108–0 over 21 seasons. Belichick is far and away the most successful coach in Patriots history; his 262 wins with the franchise are more than quadruple those of runner-up Mike Holovak. Belichick has also compiled a 30–11 record in the playoffs with New England, including a 6–3 record in Super Bowls. He has led the Patriots to 17 divisional titles, including five consecutive titles from 2003 to 2007 and eleven consecutive titles from 2009 to 2019. This streak of eleven consecutive playoff appearances is the most in NFL history for any team.

Head coaching record

Coaching record accurate as of final week of the 2022 NFL season.

Coaching tree
Bill Belichick has worked under six head coaches:
 Ted Marchibroda, Baltimore Colts (1975)
 Rick Forzano, Detroit Lions (1976)
 Tommy Hudspeth, Detroit Lions (1976–1977)
 Red Miller, Denver Broncos (1978)
 Ray Perkins, New York Giants (1979–1982)
 Bill Parcells, New York Giants (1983–1990), New England Patriots (1996), New York Jets (1997–1999)

Twenty of Belichick's assistant coaches have become NFL or NCAA head coaches (not including interim tenures):
 Rod Dowhower, Vanderbilt (1995–1996)
 Nick Saban, Michigan State (1995–1999), LSU (2001–2004), Miami Dolphins (2005–2006), Alabama (2007–present)
 Pat Hill, Fresno State (1997–2011)
 Woody Widenhofer, Vanderbilt (1997–2001)
 Kirk Ferentz, Iowa (1999–present)
 Al Groh, New York Jets (2000), Virginia (2001–2009)
 Romeo Crennel, Cleveland Browns (2005–2008), Kansas City Chiefs (2011–2012)
 Charlie Weis, Notre Dame (2005–2009), Kansas (2012–2014)
 Eric Mangini, New York Jets (2006–2008), Cleveland Browns (2009–2010)
 Josh McDaniels, Denver Broncos (2009–2010), Las Vegas Raiders (2022–present)
 Jim Schwartz, Detroit Lions (2009–2013)
 Dewayne Walker, New Mexico State (2009–2013)
 Pete Mangurian, Columbia (2012–2014)
 Bill O'Brien, Penn State (2012–2013), Houston Texans (2014–2020)
 Matt Patricia, Detroit Lions (2018–2020)
 Brian Flores, Miami Dolphins (2019–2021)
 Joe Judge, New York Giants, (2020–2021)
 Bret Bielema, Illinois (2021–present)
 Jedd Fisch, Arizona (2021–present)
 Brian Daboll, New York Giants (2022–present)

Three of Belichick's former players have become NFL or NCAA head coaches:
 Kliff Kingsbury, Texas Tech (2013–2018), Arizona Cardinals (2019–2022)
 Mike Vrabel, Tennessee Titans (2018–present)
 Kevin O'Connell, Minnesota Vikings (2022–present)

During the offseason, Belichick visits other football programs to learn from their experiences. For example, he has studied the Navy run offense, sought Bill Walsh (in past years) to understand more about the San Francisco 49ers as an organization and the West Coast offense as a system, and spent time with Jimmy Johnson to learn about drafting and contract negotiations.

The track record of Belichick's coaching tree has been characterized as poor. Former assistant coaches under Belichick had a combined 208–296–1 record as head coaches of their own teams through November 28, 2020, and a number of them ended their brief tenures as head coaches by being fired midseason. As of the end of the 2020 season, the only members of this coaching tree to have career NFL head coaching records above .500 were former coaches Groh (9–7) and O'Brien (52–48 during season, 2–4 in playoffs), and current coach Vrabel (29–19 during season, 2–2 in playoffs).

Personal life
Nick Saban and Belichick are good friends. In 2007, When Belichick spoke about their relationship, he said: "Two successful Croats in the same division of NFL. You must admit, you don't see that every day." In May 2018, President Donald Trump appointed Belichick to be a member of his Council on Sports, Fitness & Nutrition.

Belichick has an Alaskan Klee Kai dog named Nike. Interest in the breed surged after Nike made an appearance on camera during the 2020 NFL Draft.

Relationships 
Belichick married businesswoman Debby Clarke in 1977, but they divorced in the summer of 2006. The couple have three children. They allegedly separated before the 2004 season, which was disclosed by the Patriots in July 2005. Belichick was also accused of maintaining a relationship with former Giants receptionist Sharon Shenocca, which helped precipitate her divorce.

Since 2007, Belichick has been in a relationship with Linda Holliday, who is the executive director of the Bill Belichick Foundation.

Children 
He has three children with Debby Clarke Belichick: Amanda, Stephen and Brian. Amanda is a 2007 graduate of Wesleyan University, where she, like her father, played lacrosse. After college, she worked at Connecticut preparatory school Choate Rosemary Hall as a lacrosse coach and in the admissions department. In 2009 she became an assistant coach for the University of Massachusetts Amherst women's lacrosse team, before joining the Ohio State Buckeyes in the same position the next year. After serving as interim head women's lacrosse coach at Wesleyan, she was named head women's lacrosse coach at Holy Cross College in Massachusetts in July 2015. Stephen played lacrosse and football at Rutgers University on scholarship. Stephen was hired as an assistant coach with the New England Patriots in May 2012, was promoted to safeties coach in 2016, and moved to outside linebackers coach in 2020. Brian was hired to the Patriots' front office as a scouting assistant in 2016, served as a coaching assistant from 2017 to 2019, and was promoted to safeties coach prior to the 2020 season.

Declined Presidential Medal of Freedom 
On January 10, 2021, Politico reported then-President Donald Trump planned to award Belichick the Presidential Medal of Freedom. Belichick indicated that he was flattered to be considered for the honor, but declined the award in a statement issued the next day. His statement referenced the January 6 United States Capitol attack, which had occurred a few days earlier, and cited his "great reverence for our nation's values, freedom and democracy" in light of that event. A number of Massachusetts politicians, including Senator Ed Markey and Representative Jim McGovern, had previously called on him to decline after news of the award became public.

Media and entertainment
 The Belichick Plaza at Wesleyan University (formerly Warren Street lobby) was dedicated in recognition of the leadership and generosity of Belichick.
 A Song of Ice and Fire author George R. R. Martin has mentioned Belichick and the Patriots in his interviews and in his work.
 In the Madden NFL video game series, his name is not used because he is not a member of the NFL Coaches Association, which licenses the game. Belichick is the only NFL head coach who has chosen not to join the association.
 Belichick is well known as a fan of the rock band Bon Jovi, who visited Patriots training camp on August 14, 2006. Their 2002 song "Bounce" is dedicated to Belichick.
 Belichick had a cameo appearance in an episode of the Denis Leary drama Rescue Me as a mourner at a funeral, alongside former Boston Bruin Phil Esposito.
 The 2008 South Park episode "Eek, a Penis!" deals with fallout from the 2007 National Football League videotaping controversy.
 In September 2011, a two-hour documentary following Belichick through the entire 2009 season was aired as the first two episodes of the NFL Network documentary series A Football Life. According to NFL Network, the premiere was the most-watched documentary in the history of the NFL Network, and the second-most watched broadcast in the Boston media market, beating all the broadcast networks, and finishing second only to a Boston Red Sox game.
 In the Family Guy episode "3 Acts of God" it is revealed that God won't let the New England Patriots win games because Belichick never smiles.
 Belichick's "We're on to Cincinnati" press conference during the 2014 season is spoofed by comedian Frank Caliendo.
 A glowering Belichick is featured in the third episode of the twenty-eighth season of The Simpsons, entitled "The Town".
 Episode 96 of ESPN's 30 for 30 series is entitled "The Two Bills", and covers the history between Belichick and Bill Parcells.
 In 2021, Belichick received a Sports Emmy for his work as an analyst on NFL Network's "NFL 100 All-Time Team" series in 2019.

See also

 Brady–Belichick era
 List of National Football League head coach wins leaders
 List of professional gridiron football coaches with 200 wins
 List of Super Bowl head coaches
 List of National Football League head coaches by playoff record

Notes

References

Further reading

External links

 Coaching record at Pro-Football-Reference.com
 NFL.com bio
 New England Patriots bio

1952 births
Living people
American people of Croatian descent
American football offensive linemen
American football tight ends
Baltimore Colts coaches
Cleveland Browns head coaches
Coaches of American football from Maryland
Denver Broncos coaches
Detroit Lions coaches
National Football League defensive coordinators
New England Patriots coaches
New England Patriots head coaches
New York Giants coaches
New York Jets coaches
Phillips Academy alumni
Players of American football from Maryland
Sportspeople from Nashville, Tennessee
Sportspeople from Annapolis, Maryland
Super Bowl-winning head coaches
Wesleyan Cardinals football players
Wesleyan Cardinals men's lacrosse players
Wesleyan Cardinals men's squash players
Belichick family